The 2012 Players Tour Championship Grand Final (officially the 2012 Betfair Players Tour Championship Grand Final) was a professional ranking snooker tournament that took place between 14 and 18 March 2012 at the Bailey Allen Hall in Galway, Republic of Ireland.

Shaun Murphy was the defending champion, but he finished 37th on the Order of Merit, and didn't qualify.

Stephen Lee won his fifth ranking title by defeating Neil Robertson 4–0 in the final. It was Lee's first ranking title for six years, and Robertson's first defeat in a televised final.

Prize fund and ranking points
The breakdown of prize money and ranking points of the event is shown below:

Seeding list
The leading 24 players in the PTC Order of Merit qualified for the event, provided that they had played in at least 6 events (3 in the UK and 3 in Europe).

Main draw

Final

Century breaks
 
 131, 130, 104  Ricky Walden
 131, 110  Neil Robertson
 123, 105  Ding Junhui
 123  John Higgins
 120, 104  Andrew Higginson
 114, 102  Stephen Lee
 100  Xiao Guodong
 100  Joe Perry

References

External links
PTC Grand Finals 2012: Day 1 pictures by MoniqueLimbos at Facebook
PTC Grand Finals 2012: Day 2 pictures by MoniqueLimbos at Facebook
PTC Grand Finals 2012: Day 3 pictures by MoniqueLimbos at Facebook
PTC Grand Finals 2012: Day 4 pictures by MoniqueLimbos at Facebook
PTC Grand Finals 2012: Day 5 pictures by MoniqueLimbos at Facebook

2012 in Irish sport
2012
Finals
Snooker competitions in Ireland
Sport at the University of Galway
Sport in Galway (city)